is a Japanese, Tokyo-based automotive company.

Among KYB's main products company are shock absorbers, air suspensions, power steering systems, hydraulic pumps, motors, cylinders, and valves. It is one of the world's largest shock absorber manufacturers and it also has the largest market share of concrete mixer trucks in Japan, with 85% of the market.

The company has 34 manufacturing plants and 62 offices in 21 countries. KYB's American aftermarket distribution of automotive shocks and struts is headquartered in Greenwood, IN, with additional KYB manufacturing and distribution facilities in metro Chicago, Southern California, and metro Indianapolis. KYB Americas employs more than 100 people in all facilities. Shocks and struts for vehicles are the most popular KYB products distributed in North America.

Business segments and products

Automotive and motorcycle products

Automotive components
 Shock absorbers
 Semi-active air suspensions
 Adjustable shock absorbers
 Power steering systems
 Electric power steering units (EPS)
 Four-wheel steering (4WS) electric actuator
 Solenoid
 Sensors
 Noise resistant pressure sensors

Motorcycle components
 Suspensions
 Shock absorbers for ATVs
 Shock absorbers for snowmobiles

Hydraulic components
 used in construction machinery, industrial vehicles, agricultural machinery, railroad equipment, industrial machinery, building equipment, civil engineering equipment and stage equipment

Testers
 High precision leak tester
 Portable fatigue testers
 Gate type fatigue testers
 Torsional fatigue testers
 Internal pressure fatigue testers
 Shock absorbers testers
 Noise check systems
 Road simulators for automobiles
 Road simulators for motorcycles
 Simulators for research and training

Aeronautical, special-purpose vehicles and marine products
 Aircraft components
 Special-purpose vehicles
 Marine components

Environment, welfare and disaster prevention products
 Self-propelled waste checker conveyors
 Earthquake simulator trucks
 Biomixers
 Chipping vehicle for pruned branches
 Vehicle for shredding sensitive documents
 Shock absorbers for chair skis
 Solar projectors
 Mobile keeper (remote monitor camera with server function)

Source

Aircraft manufacturing

Aircraft manufacturing during and after World War II
The company between 1939 and 1941 developed several gliders, autogyros and research aircraft for the Imperial Japanese Army. These are:
 Kimura HK-1
 Kayaba Ku-2
 Kayaba Ku-3
 Kayaba Ku-4
 Kayaba Ka-Go
 Kayaba Ka-1
 Kayaba Ka-2

After the war, in 1954, the company built a gyrodyne, named Kayaba Heliplane. The development of this aircraft started in 1952 when Shiro Kayaba, the founder of the company, obtained the fuselage of a Cessna 170B and, over the course of two years, turned it into a convertiplane.

Scandal
In October, 2018, Kayaba Industry said it had falsified data on the quality of some of its shock absorbers which were used in over 70 government and municipal office buildings including Tokyo Sky Tree, Tokyo Station and facilities for 2020 Summer Olympics since at least 2003 in Japan. In addition, all the faulty Japanese quake absorbers were only exported to Taiwan.

See also 

 Shock absorber
 Car suspension
 Motorcycle suspension
 Motorcycle fork
 List of motorcycle suspension manufacturers

References

External links 
 Official global website 

Truck manufacturers of Japan
Auto parts suppliers of Japan
Construction equipment manufacturers of Japan
Defense companies of Japan
Engineering companies of Japan
Manufacturing companies based in Tokyo
Companies listed on the Tokyo Stock Exchange
Japanese companies established in 1919
Japanese brands
Fuyo Group
Motorcycle parts manufacturers
Manufacturing companies established in 1919